John Zefania Chiligati (born 14 October 1950) is a Tanzanian CCM politician and Member of Parliament for  Manyoni East constituency since 2000.

Career
After serving as a deputy minister, Chiligati was promoted to the position of Minister of Home Affairs in the Cabinet named by President Jakaya Kikwete on January 4, 2006. He was then moved to the post of Minister of Labour and Youth Development on October 15, 2006 before being named Minister of Lands and Human Development on February 12, 2008.

References

1950 births
Living people
Chama Cha Mapinduzi MPs
Tanzanian MPs 2000–2005
Tanzanian MPs 2005–2010
Tanzanian MPs 2010–2015
Mazengo Secondary School alumni
Usagara Secondary School alumni
University of Dar es Salaam alumni
Tanzania Military Academy alumni
Interior ministers of Tanzania
Labour ministers of Tanzania
Land management ministers of Tanzania
Youth ministers of Tanzania